Hostie is a village and municipality in Zlaté Moravce District of the Nitra Region, in western-central Slovakia.

History
In historical records the village was first mentioned in 1332.

Geography
The municipality lies at an altitude of 290 metres and covers an area of 28.17 km². It has a population of about 1211 people.

Ethnicity
The population is roughly 99% Slovak.

Facilities
The village has a small public library a gym and football pitch.

Genealogical resources

The records for genealogical research are available at the state archive "Statny Archiv in Nitra, Slovakia"

 Roman Catholic church records (births/marriages/deaths): 1762-1895 (parish B)

See also
 List of municipalities and towns in Slovakia

References

External links
https://web.archive.org/web/20070513023228/http://www.statistics.sk/mosmis/eng/run.html
Surnames of living people in Hostie

Villages and municipalities in Zlaté Moravce District